The Sapienza University of Rome, also called simply Sapienza or the University of Rome, and formally the Università degli Studi di Roma "La Sapienza", is a public research university located in Rome, Italy. It is one of the largest European universities by enrollments and one of the oldest in history, founded in 1303. The university is one of the most prestigious Italian universities, commonly ranking first in national rankings and in Southern Europe. In 2018, 2019, 2021 and 2022 it ranked first in the world for classics and ancient history.

Most of the Italian ruling class studied at the Sapienza. The Sapienza has educated numerous notable alumni, including many Nobel laureates, Presidents of the European Parliament and European Commissioners, heads of several nations, notable religious figures, scientists and astronauts. In September 2018, it was included in the top 100 of the QS World University Rankings Graduate Employability Ranking and in 2022 it was ranked best Italian University according to ARWU.

History

The Sapienza University of Rome was founded in 1303 with the Papal bull In Supremae praeminentia Dignitatis, issued on 20 April 1303 by Pope Boniface VIII, as a Studium for ecclesiastical studies more under his control than the universities of Bologna and Padua, making it the first pontifical university.

In 1431 Pope Eugene IV completely reorganized the studium with the bull In supremae, in which he granted masters and students alike the broadest possible privileges and decreed that the university should include the four schools of Law, Medicine, Philosophy and Theology. He introduced a new tax on wine to raise funds for the university; the money was used to buy a palace which later housed the Sant'Ivo alla Sapienza church.

However, the university's days of splendour came to an end during the sack of Rome in 1527, when the studium was closed, some of the professors having been killed and others  dispersed.  Pope Paul III restored the university shortly after his election to the pontificate in 1534.

In the 1650s the university became known as Sapienza, meaning wisdom, a title it retains. In 1703, with his private funds, Pope Clement XI purchased some land on the Janiculum, where he created a botanical garden, which soon became the most celebrated in Europe through the labours of the Trionfetti brothers. The first complete history of the Sapienza University was written in 1803–1806 by Filippo Maria Renazzi.

University students were newly animated during the 19th-century Italian revival. In 1870, La Sapienza stopped being the papal university and became the university of the capital of Italy. In 1935 the new university campus, planned by Marcello Piacentini, was completed.

On 15 January 2008 the Vatican cancelled a planned visit to La Sapienza University by Pope Benedict XVI who was to speak at the university ceremony launching the 2008 academic year due to protests by some students and professors. The title of the speech would have been 'The Truth Makes Us Good and Goodness is Truth'. Some students and professors protested in reaction to a 1990 speech that Pope Benedict XVI (then Cardinal Joseph Ratzinger) gave in which he, in their opinion, endorsed the actions of the church against Galileo in 1633.

Campuses

Sapienza University has many campuses in Rome, but its main campus is the Città Universitaria (University city), which covers  near the Roma Tiburtina Station. The university has satellite campuses outside Rome, the main one of which is in Latina.

In 2011 a project was launched to build a campus with residence halls near Pietralata station, in collaboration with the Lazio region. To cope with the ever-increasing number of applicants, the Rector also approved a new plan to expand the Città Universitaria, reallocate offices and enlarge faculties, as well as create new campuses for hosting local and foreign students.

The Alessandrina University Library (Biblioteca Universitaria Alessandrina), built in 1667 by Pope Alexander VII, is the main library housing 1.5 million volumes; it has some important collections including collezione ciceroniana and Fondo Festa.

Points of interest
 Orto Botanico dell'Università di Roma "La Sapienza", a botanical garden
 Sant'Ivo alla Sapienza
 San Pietro in Vincoli: the cloister is part of the Engineering School
 Villa Mirafiori: a Neo-Renaissance palace built during the 19th century, some rooms are decorated with fine frescoes. The Department of Philosophy is located in this building.

Academics
Since the 2011 reform, Sapienza University of Rome has eleven faculties and 65 departments. Today Sapienza, with 140,000 students and 8,000 among academic and technical and administrative staff, is the largest university in Italy. The university has significant research programmes in the fields of engineering, natural sciences, biomedical sciences and humanities.
It offers 10 Masters Programmes taught entirely in English.

Ranking

As of the 2016 Academic Ranking of World Universities (ARWU), Sapienza is positioned within the 151–200 group of universities and among the top 3% of universities in the world.

In 2016, the Center for World University Rankings ranked the Sapienza University of Rome as the 90th in the world and the top in Italy in its World University Rankings.

According to the QS Graduate Employability Ranking 2020, Sapienza places first amongst Italian universities for the indicator on Alumni Outcomes thanks to the number of university graduates employed in large companies and in managerial positions.

In 2022, Sapienza University of Rome ranked 177th in the world in QS World University Rankings.  The subject Classics and Ancient history of Sapienza is ranked the 1st in the world by QS World University Rankings by subject. As the same ranking, the subject Archaeology ranks the 10th. The subject Physics & Astronomy of Sapienza is ranked 36th, Arts and Humanities is ranked 39th, and Psychology is ranked 70th.

Admission
To cope with the large demand for admission to the university courses, some faculties hold a series of entrance examinations. The entrance test often decides which candidates will have access to the undergraduate course. For some faculties, the entrance test is only a mean through which the administration acknowledges the students' level of preparation. Students that do not pass the test can still enroll in their chosen degree courses but have to pass an additional exam during their first year.

Notable people

Some of the notable alumni and professors

Faculty and staff

Among the prominent scholars who have taught at the Sapienza University of Rome are architects Ernesto Basile and Bruno Zevi; chemist Emanuele Paternò; jurists Antonio Salandra, Sabino Cassese and Giuliano Amato; mathematician Vito Volterra; pharmacologist and Nobel Laureate in Physiology or Medicine Daniel Bovet; chemist and Nobel Laureate Giulio Natta; philosophers Luigi Ferri and Augusto Del Noce; physicist and Nobel Laureate in Physics Enrico Fermi; political scientist Roberto Forges Davanzati.

 Carlo Costamagna
 Cardinal Mazarin
 Mario Oriani-Ambrosini
 Corrado Gini, statistician
 Lucio Bini and Ugo Cerletti, psychiatrists
 Corrado Böhm, computer scientist
 Benedetto Castelli, mathematician
 Andrea Cesalpino, physician and botanist
 Federigo Enriques, mathematician
 Maria Montessori, physician and paedagogist
 Paola S. Timiras, biologist
 Barnaba Tortolini, mathematician
 Andrea Zitolo, physical-chemist
 Edoardo Amaldi
 Oscar D'Agostino
 Ettore Majorana
 Bruno Pontecorvo
 Franco Rasetti
 Giovanni Battista Beccaria
 Giovanni Jona-Lasinio
 Luciano Maiani
 Domenico Pacini
 Antonio Signorini
 Nicola Cabibbo, President of the Pontifical Academy of Sciences
 Cora Sternberg
 Carlo Franzinetti, physicist
 Alessandro Piccolo (agricultural scientist), Professor at University of Naples Federico II, Humboldt Prize in Chemistry
Bruno Luiselli, professor emeritus of Latin literature, studied the Barbarian.
Salvatore Dierna, architect, professor of environmental design

Humanities

 Glauco Benigni, Author, journalist
 Anna Maria Bisi, archaeologist
 Cesare Borgia, Cardinal, condottiero and politician of the 15th century
 Piero Boitani, literary critic, writer and academic
 Giovanni Vincenzo Gravina, jurisconsult
 Silvia Berti, historian
 Lazarus Buonamici, renaissance humanist
 Umberto Cassuto, Hebrew language and Bible scholar
 Marcel Danesi, language scientist
 Carlo Innocenzio Maria Frugoni, poet
 Count Angelo de Gubernatis, orientalist
 Predrag Matvejević, writer and academic
 Santo Mazzarino, leading historian of ancient Rome and ancient Greece
 Giuseppe Tucci, orientalist
 Mario Liverani, orientalist
 Paolo Matthiae, director of the archeological expedition of Ebla
 Antonio Nibby, archaeologist
 Diego Laynez, second general of the Society of Jesus;
 Giulio Mazzarino, politician and cardinal
 Alessandro Roncaglia, economist
 Giulio Salvadori, literary critic and poet
 Giuseppe Scaraffia, literary critic
 Ugo Spirito, philosopher
 Giuseppe Ungaretti, poet
 Bernardino Varisco, philosopher
 Musine Kokalari, Albanian writer

Collaboration 
The university entered into a collaboration with the Bahraini government and established the King Hamad Chair in Interfaith Dialogue and Peaceful co-existence in November 2018. The chair was established for entailing direct funding from the Bahraini government to La Sapienza.
In July 2021 Italian MP Laura Boldrini and chairwoman of the Standing Committee on Human Rights wrote a letter criticizing the collaboration. In her letter, Boldrini stressed the human rights situation in the Kingdom of Bahrain. The letter was a follow-up to a hearing that took place on 14 June 2021, addressing the systematic violation of human rights, the death penalty, and the condition of detention of the prisoners of conscience in the country. Boldrini drew a contrast between the values of Bahrain and that of a democracy, like Italy.

See also
 European Spatial Development Planning ESDP-Network
 List of medieval universities

Notes

References

External links
  Sapienza University of Rome Italian Website
 Sapienza University of Rome English Website

 
1303 establishments in Europe
14th-century establishments in the Papal States
Educational institutions established in the 14th century
Universities and colleges in Rome
Rome Q. VI Tiburtino